Reverse architecture is a process of deducing the underlying architecture and design of a system by observing its behaviour. It has its roots in the field of reverse engineering.

Practicing reverse architecture is used to decipher the logistics of building. There are a variety of techniques available, the most notable being architecture driven modelling.

See also
 Object Management Group
 Software modernization
 Software mining

References

External links
 About Reverse Architecture

Computer programming
Reverse engineering